Owenia is the generic name of three groups of organisms. It can refer to:

Owenia (plant), a genus of plants in the family Meliaceae
Owenia (worm) Delle Chiaje 1841, a genus of worms in the family Oweniidae
Owenia (bird) Gray 1855, a genus of birds in the family Dinornithidae
Owenia Kölliker, 1853, a genus of ctenophores, synonym of Haeckelia

See also
Oweina language, often miswritten Owenia